The Capt. Howard B. Jeffries House is a historic house in Zephyrhills, Florida, United States. It is located in the Zephyrhills Downtown Historic District at 38537 5th Avenue.

Description and history 
On November 29, 1995, it was added to the U.S. National Register of Historic Places. The house was built in 1911, enlarged in the 1920s and 1940, and was the home of city founder, Captain Jeffries. Jeffries served in the Union army and established Zephyrhills as a retirement area for old Union soldiers. (Unfortunately, the 1995 application to add this site to the National Register of Historic Places incorrectly gave his first name as Harold. The National Register has corrected the listing, but the error persists on the Internet.

References

External links
 Pasco County listings at National Register of Historic Places
 Florida's Office of Cultural and Historical Programs
 Pasco County listings
 Jeffries House

Houses on the National Register of Historic Places in Florida
Houses in Pasco County, Florida
National Register of Historic Places in Pasco County, Florida
Vernacular architecture in Florida
Houses completed in 1911
1911 establishments in Florida